Adam Freeman-Pask (born 19 June 1985) is a British International rower, World Bronze medallist, European Silver medallist and London 2012 Olympian.

Education
Born in Berkshire, he went to The Windsor Boys' School before studying Natural Science at the University of Bath, graduating in 2006. He then completed a Masters in Environmental Engineering and then a second Masters in Science Communication, both at Imperial College London.

International rowing career
Adam won his first International senior vest in 2008 at the World Rowing Championships in Linz, where he raced the Lightweight Men's Single Scull. He raced the same boat class the following season winning Bronze medals through the World Cup season but had unfortunate boat damage at the 2009 World Championships in Poznan, finishing 8th overall. Competing in both sweep and sculling disciplines he found top form in the 2011–2012 season setting a new record in the Wingfield Sculls knocking 17 seconds of the previous record time set by Peter Haining.

He then won the Scullers head, British Senior Trials, and all three World Cups in different disciplines before obtaining selection for Team GB at the London 2012 Games.

While competing for Great Britain he has also won Bronze at the 2013 World Rowing Championships in Chungju, South Korea as part of the lightweight coxless four with Will Fletcher, Jono Clegg and Chris Bartley. and a Silver Medal at the 2012 European Rowing Championships in Varese, Italy.

Achievements

Olympics
2012 London – Lightweight Men's Reserve Athlete

World Championships
2014 Amsterdam – DNS
2013 Chungju – Bronze, Lightweight Four (Bow)
2011 Bled – 6th, Lightweight Single 
2010 Karapiro – 6th, Coxless Pair (Bow)
2009 Poznań – 8th, Lightweight Single
2008 Linz – 13th, Lightweight Single

European Championships
2014 Belgrade 5th, Lightweight Single
2012 Varese Silver, Lightweight Four (Two)
2007 Poznan 7th, Double Scull (Bow)

World Cups
2013  Eton Dorney – Bronze, Lightweight Four (Bow)
2013 Sydney – Gold, Lightweight Double Scull (Bow)
2012 Munich – Gold, Lightweight Coxless Pair (Stroke)
2012 Lucerne – Gold, Lightweight Single Scull
2012 Belgrade – Gold, Lightweight Coxless Pair (Stroke)
2010 Bled – Bronze, Lightweight Coxless Pair (Bow)
2009 Munich – Bronze, Lightweight Single Scull
2009 Banyoles – Bronze, Lightweight Single Scull

World under 23 Championships
2007 Strathclyde – 5th, Lightweight Quad (Three)
2006 Hazenwinkel – 5th, Lightweight Single

GB Rowing Senior Trials
2013 – 2nd, Lightweight Single
2012 – 1st, Lightweight Single
2013 – 3rd, Lightweight Single

References

External links
 
 Adam Freeman-Pask at British Rowing (archived)

1985 births
Living people
British male rowers
World Rowing Championships medalists for Great Britain
European Rowing Championships medalists
Stewards of Henley Royal Regatta